Fox is a small lunar impact crater on the far side of the Moon. It is named after the American astronomer Philip Fox. It lies near the northern rim of the crater Wyld, and to the southeast of Babcock. This crater is bowl-shaped, with a roughly circular rim, simple sloping walls and a relatively level, featureless interior. There is some talus along the northern inner wall.

Satellite craters
By convention these features are identified on lunar maps by placing the letter on the side of the crater midpoint that is closest to Fox.

References

External links
 LTO-64D3 Fox — L&PI topographic map
Fox at The Moon Wiki

Impact craters on the Moon